Tremembé is a municipality in the state of São Paulo in Brazil. It is part of the Metropolitan Region of Vale do Paraíba e Litoral Norte. The population is 47,714 (2020 est.) in an area of 191.09 km². The elevation is 560 m.

A shrine with a wooden sculpture of the Good Jesus is located here.

References

Municipalities in São Paulo (state)
Roman Catholic shrines in Brazil